Seán Mac Eoin (30 September 1893 – 7 July 1973) was an Irish Fine Gael politician and soldier who served as Minister for Defence briefly in 1951 and from 1954 to 1957, Minister for Justice from 1948 to 1951, and Chief of Staff of the Defence Forces from February 1929 to October 1929. He served as a Teachta Dála (TD) from 1921 to 1923, and from 1929 to 1965.

He was commonly referred to as the "Blacksmith of Ballinalee".

Early life
He was born John Joseph McKeon on 30 September 1893 at Bunlahy, Granard, County Longford, the eldest son of Andrew McKeon and Katherine Treacy. After a national school education, he trained as a blacksmith at his father's forge and, on his father's death in February 1913, he took over the running of the forge and the maintenance of the McKeon family. He moved to Kilinshley in the Ballinalee district of County Longford to set up a new forge.

He had joined the United Irish League in 1908. Mac Eoin's Irish nationalist activities began in earnest in 1913, when he joined the Clonbroney Company of the Irish Volunteers. Late that year he was sworn into the Irish Republican Brotherhood and joined the Granard circle of the organization.

IRA leader
 
He came to prominence in the War of Independence as leader of an Irish Republican Army (IRA) 'flying column'. In November 1920, he led the Longford brigade in attacking Crown forces in Granard during one of the periodic government reprisals, forcing them to retreat to their barracks. On 31 October, Inspector Philip St John Howlett Kelleher of the Royal Irish Constabulary (RIC) was shot dead in Kiernan's Greville Arms Hotel in Granard. Members of the British Auxiliary Division set fire to parts of the town. The next day, Mac Eoin held the village of Ballinalee situated on the Longford Road between Longford and Granard. They stood against superior British forces, forcing them to retreat and abandon their ammunition. In a separate attack on 8 November, Mac Eoin led his men against the RIC at Ballinalee. An eighteen-year-old Constable Taylor was killed. Constable E Shateford and two others were wounded. The story was that the small garrison sang "God Save the King" as they took up positions to return fire.

On the afternoon of 7 January 1921, a joint Royal Irish Constabulary and British Army patrol consisting of ten policemen led by an Inspector, with a security detachment of nine soldiers, appeared on Anne Martin's street. Mac Eoin's own testimony at his trial (which was not contested by any parties present) states that:
 The casualties from this incident were District Inspector Thomas McGrath killed, and a police constable wounded.

On 2 February 1921, the Longford IRA ambushed a force of the Auxiliaries on the road at Clonfin, using a mine it had planted. Two lorries were involved, the first blown up, and the second strafed by rapid rifle fire. District Inspector Lt-Cmdr Worthington Craven was hit by two bullets and killed. District Inspector Taylor was shot in the chest and stomach. Four auxiliaries and a driver were killed and eight wounded. The IRA volunteers captured 18 rifles, 20 revolvers and a Lewis gun. At the Clonfin Ambush, Mac Eoin ordered his men to care for the wounded British, at the expense of captured weaponry. This earned him both praise and criticism, but became a big propaganda boost for the war effort, especially in the United States. He was admired by many within the IRA for leading practically the only effective column in the midlands. In July 1920, he was among the majority of commanders who were prepared to sign the Agreement recognizing the Volunteers as the Army of the Republic. The Oath of Allegiance was "for the purpose of ratifying under the Agreement under which the Volunteers came under the control of the Dail".

On 5 February 1921, The Anglo-Celt ran an article claiming the discovery of the body of William Chalmers, a local Protestant farmer. Mr Elliott was also a farmer, whose body was found on 30 January, lying face down in a bog.

Mac Eoin was captured at Mullingar railway station in March 1921, imprisoned and sentenced to death for the murder of an RIC District Inspector McGrath in the shooting at Anne Martin's street in January 1921.

Mac Eoin's family forge was near Currygrane, County Longford, the family home of Henry Wilson, the British CIGS. In June 1921, Wilson was petitioned for clemency by MacEoin's mother (who referred to her son as "John" in her letter), by his own brother Jemmy, and by the local Church of Ireland vicar, and passed on the appeals out of respect for the latter two individuals. Three auxiliaries had already given character references on his behalf after he had treated them chivalrously at the Clonfin Ambush in February 1921. However, Nevil Macready, British Commander-in-Chief, Ireland, confirmed the death sentence; he described Mac Eoin as "nothing more than a murderer", and wrote that he was probably responsible for other "atrocities", but also later recorded in his memoirs that Mac Eoin was the only IRA man he had met, apart from Michael Collins, to have a sense of humour. His second-in-command was from North Roscommon. Sean Connolly had a colourful career as head of Leitrim brigade.

Mac Eoin wrote the following letter to his friend (and classmate at Moyne Latin School) Father Jim Sheridan, a combatant in the Old IRA and a 'flying column' member, who had been ordained and sent to Milwaukee to study theology:

According to Oliver St. John Gogarty, Charles Bewley wrote Mac Eoin's death-sentence speech. Michael Collins organised a rescue attempt. Six IRA Volunteers, led by Paddy O'Daly and Emmet Dalton, captured a British armoured car and, wearing British Army uniforms, gained access to Mountjoy Prison. However, Mac Eoin was not in the part of the jail they believed, and after some shooting, the party retreated.

Within days, Mac Eoin was elected to Dáil Éireann at the 1921 general election, as a TD for Longford–Westmeath.

He was eventually released from prison — along with all other members of the Dáil, after Collins threatened to break off treaty negotiations with the British government unless he were freed. It was rumoured that Sean Mac Eoin was to be the best man at Collins' wedding.

Treaty and the Civil War
In the debate on the Anglo-Irish Treaty, Mac Eoin seconded Arthur Griffith's motion that it should be accepted.

Mac Eoin joined the National Army and was appointed GOC Western Command in June 1922. During the Civil War he pacified the west of Ireland for the new Free State, marching overland to Castlebar and linking up with a seaborne expedition that landed at Westport, County Mayo. His military career soared thereafter: he was appointed GOC Curragh Training Camp in August 1925, Quartermaster General in March 1927, and Chief of Staff in February 1929.

Political career

He resigned from the Army in 1929, and was elected at a by-election to Dáil Éireann for the Leitrim–Sligo constituency, representing Cumann na nGaedheal. At the 1932 general election, he returned to the constituency of Longford–Westmeath, and—with the merging of Cumann na nGaedheal into Fine Gael—continued to serve the Longford area as TD in either Longford–Westmeath (1932–37, 1948–65) or Athlone–Longford (1937–48) until he was defeated at the 1965 general election.

During a long political career he served as Minister for Justice (February 1948 – March 1951) and Minister for Defence (March–June 1951) in the First Inter-Party Government, and again as Minister for Defence (June 1954 – March 1957) in the Second Inter-Party Government.

He unsuccessfully stood twice as candidate for the office of President of Ireland, against Seán T. O'Kelly in 1945, and Éamon de Valera in 1959.

The attempt at freeing him from jail is referenced in the Jack Higgins novel The Eagle Has Landed.

Mac Eoin retired from public life after the 1965 general election, and died on 7 July 1973. He married Alice Cooney on 21 June 1922, at a ceremony attended by Griffith and Collins; she died on 16 February 1985. They had no children.

Legacy

On 16 June 2013, during the 'General Sean MacEoin Commemoration Weekend', a statue of Mac Eoin was unveiled in his home town of Ballinalee; on the same day a plaque was unveiled in Bunlahy, his birthplace. Both the statue and the plaque were unveiled by Enda Kenny, the then Taoiseach, who laid a wreath at the statue.

The forge that he worked in is still standing and is known as 'Mac Eoin forge'.

Bibliography
 'The Seán Mac Eoin Story' by Padraic O'Farrell (1981)
 'Blacksmith of Ballinalee: Sean Mac Eoin' by Padraic O'Farrell (1993)
 Witness Statement of Seán Mac Eoin submitted to the Bureau of Military History in 1955

References

 
 Lawlor, Pearse, 1920-1922: The Outrages (Cork 2011)
 MacEoin, Uinseann (ed.), Survivors (Dublin 1980)
 O'Farrel, Padraic, The Seán Mac Eoin Story (Mercier Press, Cork 1981)

External links

40 minute interview with Mac Eoin
Audio recording of Mac Eoin
Mini-documentary about the capture of Mac Eoin in Mullingar, March 1921
Biography of Mac Eoin at seanmaceoin.ie
Seán Mac Eoin papers
 

1893 births
1973 deaths
Candidates for President of Ireland
Chiefs of Staff of the Defence Forces (Ireland)
Cumann na nGaedheal TDs
Early Sinn Féin TDs
Fine Gael TDs
Irish prisoners sentenced to death
Irish Republican Army (1919–1922) members
Members of the 2nd Dáil
Members of the 3rd Dáil
Members of the 6th Dáil
Members of the 7th Dáil
Members of the 8th Dáil
Members of the 9th Dáil
Members of the 10th Dáil
Members of the 11th Dáil
Members of the 12th Dáil
Members of the 13th Dáil
Members of the 14th Dáil
Members of the 15th Dáil
Members of the 16th Dáil
Members of the 17th Dáil
Ministers for Defence (Ireland)
Ministers for Justice (Ireland)
National Army (Ireland) generals
People of the Irish Civil War (Pro-Treaty side)
Politicians from County Longford
Military personnel from County Longford
Prisoners sentenced to death by the United Kingdom
United Irish League